Asphondylia monacha is a species of gall midges in the family Cecidomyiidae.

References

Further reading

 
 

Cecidomyiinae
Articles created by Qbugbot
Insects described in 1869

Taxa named by Carl Robert Osten-Sacken
Diptera of North America
Gall-inducing insects